Washington Merry-Go-Round is a 1932 American pre-Code film directed by James Cruze and starring Lee Tracy, Constance Cummings, Walter Connolly, and Alan Dinehart. It was produced by Walter Wanger.

Plot
Button Gwinnett Brown (Lee Tracy) is a new congressman in the U.S. House of Representatives. He refuses bribes, vowing to rid Washington of corruption; but crosses swords with powerful senator Edward Norton (Alan Dinehart), who wants to enlist Brown to help Prohibition bootleggers. Norton also happens to be chasing elder senator Wylie's (Walter Connolly) granddaughter Alice (Constance Cummings), who Brown has also fallen for. In order to silence the idealistic newcomer, politicians stage a phony re-count and Brown loses his government seat. However, with the help of Senator Wylie and Alice, Brown manages to win back his place and clean up the halls of justice.

Cast
Lee Tracy as Button Gwinnett Brown 	
Constance Cummings as Alice Wylie 
Walter Connolly as Senator Wylie 
Alan Dinehart as Edward T. Norton 
Arthur Vintonas as Beef Brannigan 
Arthur Hoyt as Willis 
Berton Churchill as Speaker of the House 
Frank Sheridan as John Kelleher 
Clay Clement as Conti
Clarence Muse as Clarence
Wallis Clark as Carl Tilden (uncredited) 
Larry Steers as Guard (uncredited)
 John T. Prince as Senate Clerk (uncredited)

Critical reception
The New York Times wrote, ""Washington Merry-Go-Round" is a sturdy piece of work with melodramatic interludes. At times it is somewhat reckless in its dealings, but, allowing for its explosive utterances and its eagerness to win popular favor as an entertainment, it arouses a certain amount of interest. There are excellent performances by the cast, headed by the vehement Lee Tracy, and Mr. Cruze's direction is for the most part genuinely able"; while more recently Allmovie called it "a ridiculously contrived political tale that even in its time must have been viewed as overly simplistic"; whereas Leonard Maltin wrote that the film "remains surprisingly relevant today, with engaging performances and strong feel for the political arena, but peters out after great first half."

References

External links

 

1932 films
1930s political drama films
American black-and-white films
American political drama films
Columbia Pictures films
1930s English-language films
Films about politicians
Films directed by James Cruze
Films produced by Walter Wanger
Films set in Washington, D.C.
Films with screenplays by Jo Swerling
1932 drama films
1930s American films